The 1916 United States Senate election in Indiana took place on November 7, 1916. Incumbent Democratic U.S. Senator and Senate Majority Leader John W. Kern ran for re-election to a second term in office, he was defeated by Republican Harry New, a former Chairman of the Republican National Committee.

Democratic primary

Candidates
John W. Kern, incumbent Senator since 1911 and Democratic Caucus Chairman Leader since 1913

Results

Republican primary

Candidates
Harry Stewart New, former State Senator from Indianapolis and Chairman of the Republican National Committee
Arthur N. Robinson
James E. Watson, former U.S. Representative from Rushville

Results

After losing the primary, Watson ran in the special election for Indiana's other Senate seat caused by the death of Senator Benjamin F. Shively, which he won over Indiana's other Senator Thomas Taggart. Watson would be sworn into the U.S Senator 3 months before Senator-elect New's term began.

Progressive primary

Candidates
John N. Dyer, candidate for U.S. Representative in 1912

Results

General election

Results

 

Kern died 5 months after leaving the U.S Senate.

See also 
 1916 United States Senate elections

References

Indiana
1916
United States Senate